Tero Jartti (born 16 March 1962 in Valtimo, Finland) is a Finnish actor, director, visual artist and screenwriter.

In 1994, Jartti directed Aapo. In 2001 he acted in Cyclomania. Then in 2003, a busy year he starred in some of the years films such as The Dark Side of the Car and Dead Ends.

References

External links 

Living people
Finnish male actors
Finnish film directors
Finnish screenwriters
1962 births